Geoff Chunn is a New Zealand musician, best known as an early member of Split Enz.

Chunn was a teenage friend of Tim Finn. Together the two of them and Chunn's elder brother, Mike Chunn, founded the band Stillwater while at high school in the late 1960s. When Stillwater split up in 1971, Chunn joined acoustic group Rosewood.

In late 1972, Mike Chunn was approached by Finn to join his new band, Split Ends, which he duly did. The following year, Geoff joined the band as drummer, staying with the band (called Split Enz from early 1974) until June 1974. Following his departure from Split Enz, Chunn briefly drummed for Dragon in 1974, before forming Citizen Band in 1977 with his brother Mike. Citizen Band saw Geoff Chunn move away from drums to become the group's principal singer, guitarist and songwriter.

Notes

References
 Chunn, Mike, Stranger Than Fiction: The Life and Times of Split Enz, GP Publications, 1992. 
 Chunn, Mike, Stranger Than Fiction: The Life and Times of Split Enz, (revised, ebook edition), Hurricane Press, 2013. 
Dix, J. (1988) Stranded in paradise: New Zealand rock'n'roll 1955-1988. Wellington: Paradise Publications. .
Eggleton, D. (2003) Ready to fly: The story of New Zealand rock music. Nelson, NZ: Craig Potton Publishing. .

External links 
 Geoff Chunn discography and album reviews, credits & releases at AllMusic
 Geoff Chunn discography, album releases & credits at Discogs

APRA Award winners
Living people
Split Enz members
New Zealand drummers
New Zealand expatriates in England
Male drummers
20th-century New Zealand musicians
21st-century New Zealand musicians
Year of birth missing (living people)